William Curti Wohlforth (born 1959) is the Daniel Webster Professor of Government in the Dartmouth College Department of Government, of which he was chair for three academic years (2006-2009). Wohlforth was Editor-in-chief of Security Studies from 2008 to 2011. He is linked to the Neoclassical realism school and known for his work on American unipolarity.

Academic career

Wohlforth received his bachelor's degree in International Relations (summa cum laude) from Beloit College. He went on to receive his Master's and PhD from Yale University in International Relations as well.

He is the author of Elusive Balance: Power and Perceptions during the Cold War (Cornell, 1993) and editor of Witnesses to the End of the Cold War (Johns Hopkins, 1996) and Cold War Endgame: Oral History, Analysis, and Debates (Penn State, 2003). 

Wohlforth's 1999 article "The Stability of a Unipolar World" and the book World Out of Balance: International Relations Theory and the Challenge of American Primacy (co-authored with Stephen G. Brooks) are influential in the field of international relations. In the article and book, Wohlforth challenges the view that US supremacy following the end of the Cold War will be short-lived.

References

External links
Wohlforth's biography on the Dartmouth web site
Papers by William Wohlforth
Works at International Security Journal

Dartmouth College faculty
American international relations scholars
Political realists
Neoclassical realists(international relations)
Living people
Academic journal editors
Yale Graduate School of Arts and Sciences alumni
Beloit College alumni
1959 births
American political scientists